Duchess of Abercorn is typically a title of the wife of the Duke of Abercorn, and may refer to:

 Louisa Hamilton, Duchess of Abercorn (1812–1905), wife of the 1st Duke
 Mary Hamilton, Duchess of Abercorn (1848–1929), wife of the 2nd Duke
 Rosalind Hamilton, Duchess of Abercorn (1869–1958), wife of the 3rd Duke
 Kathleen Hamilton, Duchess of Abercorn (1905–1990), wife of the 4th Duke
 Alexandra Hamilton, Duchess of Abercorn (1946–2018), wife of the 5th Duke